Chul-soo, also spelled Cheol-su, Cheol-soo, Chol-su, or Chol-soo, is a Korean masculine given name. Its meaning differs based on the hanja used to write each syllable of the name. There are 11 hanja with the reading "chul" and 67 hanja with the reading "soo" on the South Korean government's official list of hanja which may be used in given names.

People with this name include:
Im Cheol-su (born 1920s), South Korean victim of the 1969 Korean Air Lines YS-11 hijacking
Park Chul-soo (1948–2013), South Korean film director
Kim Chul-soo (footballer) (born 1952), South Korean footballer
Chol Soo Lee (born 1952), South Korean-born American man wrongfully convicted of a 1973 murder
Bae Cheol-soo (born 1953), South Korean radio host and former singer
Ahn Cheol-soo (born 1962), South Korean businessman and politician
Choe Chol-su (born 1969), North Korean boxer
Kim Chul-soo (volleyball) (born 1970), South Korean volleyball player, medalist in volleyball at the 1994 Asian Games
Jang Cheol-soo (born 1974), South Korean film director
Kim Chol-su (born 1982), North Korean judo practitioner

Fictional characters with this name include
Chul-soo, in 2012 South Korean film A Werewolf Boy
Park Chul-soo, in 2006 South Korean television series What's Up Fox

See also
List of Korean given names

References

Korean masculine given names